In early Philippine history, the Tagalog Bayan ("country" or "city-state") of Maynila was a major Tagalog city-state on the southern part of the Pasig River delta, where the district of Intramuros currently stands.

Historical accounts indicate that the city-state was led by sovereign rulers who were referred to with the title of raja ("king"). Other accounts also refer to it as the "Kingdom of Luzon", although some historians suggest that this might rather refer to the Manila Bay region as a whole.

The earliest oral traditions suggest that Maynila was founded as a Muslim principality in as early as the 1250s, supposedly supplanting an even older pre-Islamic settlement. However, the earliest archeological findings for organized human settlements in the area dates to around 1500s. By the 16th century, it was already an important trading center, with extensive political ties with the Sultanate of Brunei and extensive trade relations with traders from the Ming dynasty. With Tondo, the polity on the northern part of the Pasig River delta, it established a duopoly on the intraarchipelagic trade of Chinese goods.

Maynila and Luzon are sometimes associated with the Bruneian legends which describe a settlement called "Seludong", but Southeast Asian scholars believe this refers to a settlement Mount Selurong in Indonesia. For political reasons, the historical rulers of Maynila maintained close cognatic ties through intermarriage with the ruling houses of the Sultanate of Brunei, but Brunei's political influence over Maynila is not considered to have extended to military or political rule.  Intermarriage was a common strategy for large thassalocratic states such as Brunei to extend their influence, and for local rulers such as those of Maynila to help strengthen their family claims to nobility. Actual political and military rule over the large distances characteristic of Maritime Southeast Asia was not possible until relatively modern times.

By 1570, Maynila was under the rule of two paramount rulers (the more senior Rajah Matanda and the younger Rajah Sulayman), who in turn had several lower-ranked rulers ("Datu") under them.  This was the political situation encountered by Martin de Goiti when he attacked Maynila in May of that year. This "Battle of Maynila" ended with a fire that destroyed the fortified settlement of Maynila, although it is not clear whether the fire was set by Goiti or by the inhabitants themselves as part of the scorched earth tactics typically used in the archipelago during that era.

Maynila had been partially rebuilt by the following year, 1571, when the full forces of de Goiti's superior, Miguel López de Legazpi, arrived in the city to claim it as a territory of New Spain. After extensive negotiations with the leaders of Maynila and those of the neighbouring settlement in Tondo, Maynila was declared as the new Spanish city of Manila on June 24, 1571, effectively ending Maynila's history as an independent polity.

Sources
Laura Lee Junker, in her 1998 review of primary sources regarding archaic Philippine polities, lists the primary sources of information regarding the river delta polities of Maynila and Tondo as "Malay texts, Philippine oral traditions, Chinese tributary records and geographies, early Spanish writings, and archaeological evidence." Primary sources for the history of Rajah Kalamayin's Namayan, further upriver, include artifacts dug up from archaeological digs (the earliest of which was Robert Fox’s work for the National Museum in 1977) and Spanish colonial records (most notably those compiled by the 19th century Franciscan Historian Fray Felix Huerta).

Junker noted the inherent biases of each of the written sources, emphasizing the need to counter-check their narratives with one another, and with empirical archeological evidence.

Etymology 

Maynilà comes from the Tagalog phrase may-nilà, which translates to "where indigo is found." Nilà is derived from the Sanskrit word  nīla (नील) which refers to indigo, and, by extension, to several plant species from which this natural dye can be extracted. The Maynilà name is more likely in reference to the presence of indigo-yielding plants growing in the area surrounding the settlement, rather than Maynilà being known as a settlement that trades in indigo dye, since the settlement was founded several hundred years before indigo dye extraction became an important economic activity in the area in the 18th century. The native Tagalog name for the indigo plant, tayum (or variations thereof) actually finds use in another toponym within the Manila area: Tayuman, "where the indigo (plant) is."

An inaccurate but nevertheless persistent etymology asserts the origin of the placename as may-nilad ("where nilad is found"). Here, nilad refers to either: (incorrectly) the water hyacinth (Eichhornia crassipes), which is a recent introduction to the Philippines from South America and therefore could not have been the plant species referred to in the toponym; or (correctly) a shrub-like tree (Scyphiphora hydrophyllacea, formerly Ixora manila Blanco) found in or near mangrove swamps, and known as nilád or nilár in Tagalog.

From a linguistic perspective, it is unlikely for native Tagalog speakers to completely drop the final consonant /d/ in nilad to achieve the present form Maynilà. Historian Ambeth Ocampo also states that in all early documents the place had always been called "Maynilà" (eventually adopted into Spanish as Manila) — and never referred to with the final /d/. Despite the may-nilad etymology being erroneous, it continues to be perpetuated through uncritical repetition in both literature and popular imagination.

Maynila as the Kingdom of Luzon 
Portuguese and Spanish accounts from the early  to mid 1500s state that the Maynila polity was the same as the "kingdom" that had been referred to as the "Kingdom of Luzon" (Portuguese: Luçon, locally called "Lusong"), and whose residents had been called "Luções".

Magellan expedition member Rodrigo de Aganduru Moriz's account of the events of 1521 specifically describes how the Magellan expedition, then under the command of Sebastian Elcano after the death of Magellan, captured of one of the Luções: Prince Ache, who would later be known as Rajah Matanda, who was then serving as a commander of the Naval forces of Brunei. Aganduru Moriz described the "young prince" as being "the Prince of Luzon - or Manila, which is the same.”  corroborated by fellow expedition member Gines de Mafra and the account of expedition scribe Antonio Pigaffetta.

This description of Ache as "King of Luzon" was further confirmed by the Visayan allies of Miguel Lopez de Legaspi, who, learning that he wanted to "befriend" the ruler of Luzon, led him to write a letter to Ache, whom he addressed as the "King of Luzon".

Kapampangan scholar Ian Christopher Alfonso, however, notes that the demonym Luções was probably expansive enough to include even Kapampangan sailors, such as the sailors from Hagonoy and Macabebe who would later be involved in the 1571 Battle of Bangkusay Channel.

The name Luzon, which French linguist Jean-Paul Potet explains was the name given to the Pasig River delta area, is thought to derive from the Tagalog word lusong, which is a large wooden mortar used in dehusking rice. A 2008 PIDS research paper by Eulito Bautista and Evelyn Javier provides an image of a Lusong, and explains that, "Traditional milling was accomplished in the 1900s by pounding the palay with a wooden pestle in a stone or wooden mortar called lusong. The first pounding takes off the hull and further pounding removes the bran but also breaks most grains. Further winnowing with a bamboo tray (bilao) separates the hull from the rice grains. This traditional hand-pounding chore, although very laborious and resulted in a lot of broken rice, required two to three skilled men and women to work harmoniously and was actually a form of socializing among young folks in the villages."

Maynila as a "Bayan" 
According to the earliest Tagalog dictionaries, large coastal settlements like Tondo and Maynila, which were ultimately led by a Lakan or Rajah, were called "Bayan" in the Tagalog language. This term (which is translated today as "town") was common among the various languages of the Philippine archipelago, and eventually came to refer to the entire Philippines, alongside the word Bansa (or Bangsa, meaning "nation").

Austronesian origins of Maynila 

As with virtually all the lowland peoples of Maritime Southeast Asia, the Tagalog people who established the fortified polity of Maynila were Austronesians. They had a rich, complex culture, with its own expressions of language and writing, religion, art, and music. This Austronesian culture was already in place before the cultural influences of China, the Indonesian thassalocracies of Srivijaya and Majapahit, and Brunei, and eventually, the western colonial powers. The core elements of this Austronesian culture also persisted despite the introduction of Buddhism, Hinduism, Islam and, later, Christianity. Elements of these belief systems were syncretistically adapted by the Tagalogs to enrich their already-existing worldviews, elements of which still persist today in the syncretistic forms known as Folk Catholicism and Folk Islam.

These Austronesian cultures are defined by their languages, and by a number of key technologies including the cultural prominence of boats, the construction of thatched houses on piles, the cultivation of tubers and rice, and a characteristic social organization typically led by a “big man” or “man of power”.

Politics and governance

Societal structure
The pre-colonial Tagalog barangays of Manila, Pampanga and Laguna had a more complex social structure than the cultures of the Visayas, enjoying a more extensive commerce through their Bornean political contacts, and engaging in farming wet rice for a living.  The Tagalogs were thus described by the Spanish Augustinian friar Martin de Rada as more traders than warriors.

In his seminal 1994 work "Barangay: Sixteenth Century Philippine Culture and Society" (further simplified in the briefer by the Presidential Communications Development and Strategic Planning Office in 2015), historian William Henry Scott delineates the three classes of Tagalog society during the 1500s:
 the Maginoo (ruling class), which included the Lakan or Rajah and the Datus under him;
 A class described as "Freemen" consisting of Timawa and Maharlika; and
 Alipin (slaves), which could further be subcategorized as Aliping Namamahay or Alipin Sa Gigilid.

Culture and society

Clothing and accoutrements 
Early Spanish accounts describe the Tagalogs as using local plants to dye their cotton clothing.  This included tayum or tagum, which produced a blue dye, and dilao, which produced a yellow dye.

Unlike the Visayans to the south, the Tagalogs did not practice tattooing.  In fact, Rajah Sulayman used tattooedness as a pejorative description when the Spanish forces first met him; Sulayman said that Tagalogs were unlike the "painted" Visayans, and thus would not allow themselves to be taken advantage of as easily.

Religion

Historical accounts, supported by archeological and linguistic evidence and corroborated by anthropological studies, show that the Tagalog people, including those in Tondo and Maynila, practiced a set of Austronesian beliefs and practices which date back to the arrival of Austronesian peoples, although various elements were later syncretistically adapted from Hinduism, Mahayana Buddhism, and Islam.

The Tagalogs did not have a specific name for this set of religious beliefs and practices, although later scholars and popular writers refer to it as Anitism, or, less accurately, using the general term "animism."

Coexistence with and syncretistic adaptation from other beliefs 
One specific exception to the predominance of "Anitism" in early Tondo and Maynila was that the apex-level leaders of these polities identified themselves as Muslims, as did the migrant sailor Luzones who were encountered by early 15th century chroniclers in Portuguese Malacca.  However, the various ethnographic reports of the period indicate that this seemed to only be a nominal identification ("Muslim by name") because there was only a surface level acknowledgement of Muslim norms (avoidance of pork, non-consumption of blood, etc.) without an "understanding of Mohammedan teachings."  Scholars generally believe that this nominal practice of Islam actually represented the early stages of Islamization, which would have seen a much more extensive practice of Muslim beliefs had the Spanish not arrived and introduced their brand of Iberian Catholicism.

Osborne (2004) describes a similar process of "adaptation" happening in connection with Hindu and Buddhist influences in the various cultures of Maritime Southeast Asia, and emphasizes that this "indianization" of Southeast Asia did not per-se overwrite existing indigenous patterns, cultures, and beliefs: "Because Indian culture “came” to Southeast Asia, one must not think that Southeast Asians lacked a culture of their own. Indeed, the generally accepted view is that Indian culture made such an impact on Southeast Asia because it fitted easily with the existing cultural patterns and religious beliefs of populations that had already moved a considerable distance along the path of civilization.[…] Southeast Asians, to summarize the point, borrowed but they also adapted. In some very important cases, they did not need to borrow at all."

Tagalog religious cosmology 
The Tagalog belief system was more or less anchored on the idea that the world is inhabited by spirits and supernatural entities, both good and bad, and that respect must be accorded to them through worship.

According to the early Spanish  missionary-ethnographers, the Tagalog people believed in a creator-god named "Bathala", whom they referred to both as maylicha (creator; lit. "actor of creation") and maycapal (lord, or almighty; lit. "actor of power").  Loarca and Chirino also report that in some places, they were  "Molayri" (Molaiari) or "Diwata" (Dioata)."

However, these early missionary-ethnographers also noted that the Tagalogs did not include Bathala in their daily acts of worship (pag-a-anito).  Buenaventura was informed that this was because the Tagalogs believed Bathala was too mighty and distant to be bothered with the concerns of mortal man, and so the Tagalogs focused their acts of appeasement to "lesser" deities and powers, immediate spirits which they believed had control over their day-to-day life.

Because the Tagalogs did not have a collective word to describe all these spirits together, Spanish missionaries eventually decided to call them "anito," since they were the subject of the Tagalog's act of pag-aanito (worship). According to Scott, accounts and early dictionaries describe them as intermediaries ("Bathala's agents"), and the dictionaries "used the word abogado (advocate) when defining their realms."  These sources also show, however, that in practice, they were addressed directly: "in actual prayers, they were petitioned directly, not as intermediaries." Modern day writers divide these spirits are broadly into the categories of "Ancestor spirits, nature spirits, and guardian spirits," although they also note that the dividing line between these categories is often blurred.

Demetrio, Cordero-Fernando, and Nakpil Zialcita observe that the Luzon Tagalogs and Kapampangans' use of the word "Anito", instead of the word "Diwata" which was more predominant in the Visayan regions, indicated that these peoples of Luzon were less influenced by the Hindu and Buddhist beliefs of the Madjapahit empire than the Visayans were.  They also observed that the words were used alternately amongst the peoples in the southernmost portions of Luzon - the Bicol Region, Marinduque, Mindoro, etc.  They suggested that this have represented transitional area, the front lines of an increased "Indianized" Madjapahit influence which was making its way north the same way Islam was making its way north from Mindanao.

Foreign cultural influences

Trade and cultural influences from China, India, and Maritime Southeast Asia 

The early inhabitants of the present-day Manila engaged in trade relations with its Asian neighbours as well as with the Hindu empires of Java and Sumatra, as confirmed by archaeological findings. Trade ties with China became extensive by the 10th century, while contact with Arab merchants reached its peak in the 12th century.

Beginnings of Islamization in Luzon (1175 – 1500s)
Archeological findings provide evidence that followers of Islam had reached the Pasig River area by 1175; among the graves found on the Sta. Ana burial site were a number of Muslim burials.

Islamization was a slow process which occurred with the steady conversion of the citizenry of Tondo and Manila created Muslim domains. The Bruneians installed the Muslim rajahs, Rajah Salalila and Rajah Matanda in the south (now the Intramuros district) and the Buddhist-Hindu settlement was ruled under Lakan Dula in northern Tundun (now Tondo). Islamization of Luzon began in the sixteenth century when traders from Brunei settled in the Manila area and married locals while maintaining kinship and trade links with Brunei and thus other Muslim centres in Southeast Asia. The Muslims were called "Moros" by the Spanish who assumed they occupied the whole coast. There is no evidence that Islam had become a major political or religious force in the region, with Father Diego de Herrera recording that the Moros lived only in some villages and were Muslim in name only.

Economic activities
Historians widely agree that the larger coastal polities which flourished throughout the Philippine archipelago in the period immediately prior to the arrival of the Spanish colonizers (including Tondo and Maynila) were "organizationally complex", demonstrating both economic specialization and a level of social stratification which would have led to a local demand for "prestige goods".

Specialized industries in the Tagalog and Kapampangan regions, including Tondo and Maynila, included agriculture, textile weaving, basketry, metallurgy, hunting, among others. The social stratification which gave birth to the Maginoo class created a demand for prestige products including ceramics, textiles, and precious stones. This demand, in turn, served as the impetus for both internal and external trade.

Junker notes that significant work still needs to be done in analyzing the internal/local supply and demand dynamics in pre-Spanish era polities, because much of the prior research has tended to focus on their external trading activities. Scott notes that early Spanish lexicons are particularly useful for this analysis, because these early dictionaries captured many words which demonstrate the varied nuances of these local economic activities.

Trade 
Junker describes coastal polities of Tondo and Maynila's size as "administrative and commercial centers functioning as important nodes in networks of external and internal trade." While the basic model for the movement of trade goods in early Philippine history saw coastal settlements at the mouth of large rivers (in this case, the Pasig river delta) controlling the flow of goods to and from settlements further upriver (in this case, the upland polities on the Laguna Lake coast), Tondo and Maynila had trade arrangements which allowed them to control trade throughout the rest of the archipelago. Scott observes that while the port of Tondo had the monopoly on arriving Chinese merchant ships, it was Manila's fleet of trading vessels which in turn retailed them to settlements throughout the rest of the archipelago, so much so that Manyila's ships came to be known as "Chinese" (sinina).

Redistribution of Chinese and Japanese goods 
The most lucrative of Tondo's economic activities involved the redistribution of Chinese goods, which would arrive in Manila bay through Tondo's port and be  distributed throughout the rest of the archipelago, mostly through Maynila's extensive shipping activities.

The Chinese and Japanese migrations to Malaya and the Philippines shore began in the 7th century and reached their peak after 1644 owing to the Manchu conquest of China. These Chinese and Japanese immigrants settled in Manila, Pasig included, and in the other ports, which were annually visited by their trade junks, they have cargoes of silk, tea, ceramics, and their precious jade stones.

According to William Henry Scott (1982), when ships from China and Japan came to Manila bay, Lakandula would remove the sails and rudders of their ships until they paid him duties and anchorage fees, and then he would then buy up all their goods himself, paying half its value immediately and then paying the other half upon their return the following year.  In the interim, these goods would be traded throughout the rest of the archipelago. The result was that other locals were not able to buy anything from the Chinese and Japanese directly, but from Tondo and Maynila, who made a tidy profit as a result.

Augustinian Fray Martin de Rada Legaspi says that the Tagalogs were "more traders than warriors", and Scott notes in a later book (1994) that Maynila's ships got their goods from Tondo and then dominated trade through the rest of the archipelago.  People in other parts of the archipelago often referred to Maynila's boats as "Chinese"  or "Japanese' (Sina or Sinina) because they came bearing Chinese and Japanese goods.

Agriculture 
The people of Tondo engaged in agriculture. A report during the time of Miguel López de Legazpi noted of the great abundance of rice, fowls, wine as well as great numbers of carabaos, deer, wild boar  and goat husbandry in Luzon. In addition, there were also great quantities of cotton and colored clothes, wax, wine, honey and date palms produced by the native peoples, rice, cotton, swine, fowls, wax and honey abound.

Crop production 
Rice was the staple food of the Tagalog and Kapampangan polities, and its ready availability in Luzon despite variations in annual rainfall was one of the reasons Legaspi wanted to locate his colonial headquarters on Manila bay. Scott's study of early Tagalog lexicons revealed that the Tagalogs had words for at least 22 different varieties of rice.

In most other places in the archipelago, rootcrops served as an alternate staple in seasons when rice was not readily available. These were also available in Luzon, but they were desired more as vegetables, rather than as a staple.  Ubi, Tugi, Gabi and a local root crop which the Spanish called Kamoti (apparently not the same as the sweet potato, sweet potato, Ipomoea batatas) were farmed in swiddens, while "Laksa" and "Nami" grew wild. Sweet potatoes (now called Camote) were later introduced by the Spanish.

Millet was common enough that the Tagalogs had a word which meant "milletlike": "dawa-dawa".

Historical events

Austronesian migrations ( 3,500 years ago) 
There is some debate about whether the Austronesian culture first came to the island of Luzon from continental Asia as proposed by Peter Bellwood and Robert Blust, or from Maritime Southeast Asia as proposed by Wilhelm Solheim and William Meacham. But whichever route these Austronesians first used to get to the Philippine archipelago, the general consensus among scholars is that they settled on what is now the island of Luzon during the earliest stages of their migratory dispersal no later than about 3,500 years ago, and later waves of migration spread from the Philippine archipelago to reach as far east as Easter Island, and as far west as Madagascar.

The Tagalog people and language 

Not much is known about when the Tagalog and Kapampangan peoples came to occupy the lands surrounding Manila Bay, but linguists such as Dr. David Zorc and Dr. Robert Blust speculate that the Tagalogs and other Central Philippine ethno-linguistic groups originated in Northeastern Mindanao or the Eastern Visayas. The Tagalog language is believed to have branched out from a hypothesized "proto-language" which linguists have dubbed "Proto-Philippine language," another branch of which was the Visayan languages.

Some Filipino historians such as Jaime Tiongson have asserted that some of the words used in the Laguna Copperplate Inscription came from Old Tagalog, although the text itself used the Javanese Kawi script.

Theories and legends regarding the establishment of Manila ( mid-13th century –  early 16th century )

Establishment through defeat of Rajah Avirjirkaya by Rajah Ahmad of Brunei ( 1258) 
According to Mariano A. Henson's genealogical research (later brought up by Majul in 1973, and by Santiago in 1990) a settlement in the Maynila area already existed by the year 1258. This settlement was ruled by "Rajah Avirjirkaya" whom Henson described as a "Majapahit Suzerain".

According to Henson, this settlement was attacked by a Bruneian commander named Rajah Ahmad, who defeated Avirjirkaya and established Maynila as a "Muslim principality".

Chinese Records (1304) 
The Chinese History Annals, Nanhai Zhi, corroborate the claim that then (Hindu) Brunei had invaded Maynila as Maynila was mentioned as one of the polities being ruled over by Brunei (Malilu 麻裏蘆 as mentioned in Yuan records), this Malilu being Maynila, was ruled from Brunei which was then labelled as "Poni" and Maynila was subjugated alongsides other Philippine kingdoms such as: May-i (in Mindoro), Meikun 美昆 (present-day Manukan), Puduan (Butuan), Sulu, Shahuchong 沙胡重 (present-day Siocon), Yachen 啞陳 (present-day Oton), Manaluonu 麻拿囉奴, and Wenduling 文杜陵 (present-day Mindanao).

Early references to Selurong (1360s) 

In the mid 14th century, the Majapahit empire mentioned in its manuscript Nagarakretagama Canto 14, written by Prapanca in 1365, that the area of Saludung (Selurong) and Solot (Sulu) were parts of the empire. Nagarakretagama was composed as a eulogy for their emperor Hayam Wuruk. Chinese source mentioned that in 1369, the pirates of Sulu attacked Po-ni (Brunei), looting it of treasure and gold. A fleet from Majapahit succeeded in driving away the Sulus, but Po-ni was left weaker after the attack.

Establishment by Sultan Bolkiah and the Sultanate of Brunei ( 1500) 
According to Bruneian oral tradition, a city with the Malay name of Selurong, which would later become the city of Maynila) was formed around the year 1500. This oral tradition claims that Sultan Bolkiah (1485–1521) of the Sultanate of Brunei attacked Tondo and established the polity of Seludong (Maynila) as a satellite state of the Sultanate of Brunei. This is narrated through Tausug and Malay royal histories, where the names Seludong, Saludong or Selurong are used to denote Manila prior to colonisation.

The traditional Rajahs of Tondo, the Lakandula, retained their titles and property but the real political power came to reside in the House of Soliman, the Rajahs of Maynila.

Lusung and the Luzones (1511 – early 1570s)

During the early 16th century, Portuguese sailors in Malaysia referred to the Tagalog people who lived in Manila Bay ("Lusong", Portuguese: Luçon) using the demonym Luções (Spanish: Luzones).

Surviving primary documents referring to these Luções include the accounts of Fernão Mendes Pinto (1614); Tomé Pires (whose written documents were published in 1944); and the survivors of Ferdinand Magellan's expedition, including expedition members Gines de Mafra and Rodrigo de Aganduru Moriz and the Italian scholar Antonio Pigafetta who served as the expedition's primary scribe, and published his account in 1524.

Territorial conflicts with Tondo (before 1521) 

According to the account of Rajah Matanda as recalled by Magellan expedition members Gines de Mafra, Rodrigo de Aganduru Moriz, and expedition scribe Antonio Pigafetta, Rajah Matanda's father (whose name was not mentioned in the accounts) died when he was still very young. Rajah Matanda's mother (also unnamed in the Spanish accounts) then became the paramount ruler of the Maynila polity. In the meantime, Rajah Matanda, then simply known as the "Young Prince" Ache, was raised alongside his cousin, who was ruler of Tondo - presumed by some to be a young Bunao Lakandula, although not specifically named in the Spanish accounts.

During this time, Ache realized that his cousin, who was ruler of Tondo, was "slyly"
taking advantage of Ache's mother, by taking over territory belonging to Maynila. When Ache asked his mother for permission to address the matter, his mother refused, encouraging the young prince to keep his peace instead.

Prince Ache could not accept this and thus left Maynila with some of his father's trusted men, to go to his "grandfather", the Sultan of Brunei, to ask for assistance. The Sultan responded by giving Ache a position as commander of his naval force.

Pigaffetta noted that Ache was "much feared in these parts", but especially the non-Muslim locals, who considered the Sultan of Brunei an enemy.

Capture of Prince Ache by the Elcano (Magellan) expedition (1521) 
In 1521, Ache was coming fresh from a military victory at the helm of the Bruneian navy as he just razed the Buddhist city of Laoue in Southwest Borneo to the ground, under orders from his grandfather, the Bruneian Sultan, and was supposedly on his way to Maynila with the intent of confronting his cousin when he came upon and attacked the remnants of the Magellan expedition, then under the command of Sebastian Elcano. Some historians suggest that Ache's decision to attack must have been influenced by a desire to expand his fleet even further as he made his way back to Lusong and Maynila, where he could use the size of his fleet as leverage against his cousin, the ruler of Tondo.

Ache was eventually released, supposedly after the payment of a large ransom. One of Ache's slaves, who was not included in the ransom payment, then became a translator for the Elcano expedition.

Beginning of the Spanish colonial era (1570s) 
In the mid-16th century, the areas of present-day Manila were governed by native rajahs. Rajah Matanda (whose real name was recorded by the Legaspi expedition as Ache) and his nephew, Rajah Sulayman "Rajah Mura" or "Rajah Muda" (a Sanskrit title for a Prince), ruled the Muslim communities south of the Pasig River, including Maynila while Lakan Dula ruled non-Muslim Tondo north of the river. These settlements held ties with the sultanates of Brunei, Sulu, and Ternate, Indonesia (not to be confused with Ternate in present-day Cavite). Maynila was centered on a fortress at the mouth of the Pasig river (Kota means fortress or city in Malay). When the Spanish came and invaded Manila they described, Kota Selurong, "The City of Selurong" of Maynila, as a settlement with a fortress of rammed earth with stockades and in between battlements there are cannons. The cannons were native-made and forged by Panday Piray and these were locally called lantakas. When the Spanish invaded and burned Manila's Kota Selurong to the ground, they built up the Christian walled city of Intramuros on the ruins of Islamic Manila.

Notable rulers of Maynila

Historical rulers of Maynila
A number of rulers of Maynila are specifically identified in historical documents, which include: 
 the epistolary firsthand accounts of the members of the Magellan and Legaspi expeditions, referred to in Spanish as "relaciones";  These include the Sulu and Maguindanao Tarsilas, and the Batu Tarsila of Brunei. and
 various notarized genealogical records kept by the early Spanish colonial government, mostly in the form of last wills and testaments of descendants of said rulers;

[†] Term used by original Hispanocentric text); the exact local term used by the individual was not recorded in the historical account.

Legendary rulers
A number of rulers of Maynila are known only through oral histories, which in turn have been recorded by various documentary sources''', ranging from historical documents describing oral histories, to contemporary descriptions of modern (post-colonial/national-era) oral accounts. These include:
 orally transmitted genealogical traditions, such as the Batu Tarsila, which have since been recorded and cited by scholarly accounts; 
 legends and folk traditions documented by anthropologists, local government units, the National Historical Institute of the Philippines, and other official sources; and 
 recently published genealogical accounts based on contemporary research.

Academic acceptance of the details recounted in these accounts vary from case to case, and are subject to scholarly peer review.

See also

Luções
 Rajah Sulayman
 Battle of Bangkusay Channel
 History of Manila
 List of Sunni Muslim dynasties
 History of the Philippines (Before 1521)
 Hinduism in the Philippines
 Namayan
 Cainta (historical polity)
 Tondo (historical polity)

Footnotes

References

Further reading
 Nick Joaquin's Almanac for Manileños
 The River Dwellers by Grace P. Odal

1571 disestablishments
States and territories established in 1500
Barangay states
Former countries in Bruneian history
Former countries in Philippine history
Historical regions
History of the Philippines (900–1565)
History of Manila
History of Luzon
States and territories established in the 1500s
1500 establishments in Asia
City-states
Former monarchies